Pascal-Pierre Paillé (born May 30, 1978) is a Canadian politician, who was elected to represent the electoral district of Louis-Hébert in the 2008 Canadian federal election. He is a member of the Bloc Québécois.

Born in Sherbrooke, Quebec, Paillé is the nephew of Daniel Paillé, Leader of the Bloc Québécois and former Parti Québécois MNA in the National Assembly of Quebec who was elected as the MP for Hochelaga in a 2009 by-election. He is married to Hélène Guillemette, who ran as a PQ candidate in the 2008 provincial election.

References

External links
Pascal-Pierre Paillé

1978 births
Living people
Bloc Québécois MPs
French Quebecers
Members of the House of Commons of Canada from Quebec
Politicians from Quebec City
Politicians from Sherbrooke
Université Laval alumni